Dinosaur vs. Bedtime is a children's book, written and illustrated by Bob Shea. Published by Hyperion Books in 2008, Dinosaur vs. Bedtime tells the story of a young dinosaur taking on a series of challenges before going to bed.

Story 
The plot of Dinosaur vs. Bedtime centers around a young dinosaur that takes on many challenges, including adults, brushing his teeth, taking a bath, and eating spaghetti.  The dinosaur takes on all the challenges put before, defeating them all by roaring at them, until he comes up against his final (or "biggest") challenge, bedtime.  In the end "bedtime wins" and the dinosaur goes to sleep.  The dinosaur is used in the story to represent a stubborn child who does not want to go to bed.  Dinosaur vs. Bedtime was illustrated by Shea, who utilized mixed media including crayon, paint and photography.

References

External links
Bob Shea reading the book on Noggin

2008 children's books
American picture books
Children's books about dinosaurs